The 10s Spot is a satellite radio music channel that plays music from the 2010s. Originally launched on November 3, 2021, it airs on Sirius XM Radio Channel 11. The station plays pop, R&B, and hip hop songs from 2010 to 2019, and is commercial-free with the exception of station IDs, which primarily reference memes and pop culture references from the decade.

Selected Artists Played from:

 Taylor Swift

 Drake

 Fall Out Boy

 Lady Gaga

 Justin Timberlake

 Adele

 Coldplay

 Rihanna

 Fetty Wap

 Bruno Mars

 Selena Gomez

 Beyonce

 Justin Bieber

 Ed Sheeran

 Katy Perry

 Halsey

 DJ Khaled

 P!nk

 The Weeknd

 Post Malone

 Kelly Clarkson

 Meghan Trainor

 Miley Cyrus

 Nicki Minaj

 Ariana Grande

 Shawn Mendes

 Maroon 5

 Calvin Harris

 Sia

 Charlie Puth

 Ke$ha

 Demi Lovato

References

See also 
 List of Sirius XM Radio channels

Decades themed radio stations
2010s-themed radio stations
Radio stations established in 2021
Sirius XM Radio channels